The year 2021 will the seventh year in the history of the Rizin Fighting Federation, a mixed martial arts promotion based in Japan. It started broadcasting through a television agreement with Fuji Television. In North America and Europe Rizin FF is available on PPV all over the world and on live-now.

Background
Nobuyuki Sakakibara announced that Rizin is planning to work in copromotion with new Japanese promotion MEGA.

He also announced that they will work with Scott Coker to bring the Bellator Bantamweight World Champion Juan Archuleta in Japan to face the winner of the Rizin Bantamweight Championship bout between Kai Asakura and Kyoji Horiguchi.

List of events

Grand Prix
On March 26, 2021, it was announced that a Bantamweight Grand Prix will be held during the year: beginning in Rizin 28 – Tokyo and ending in the Rizin New Year's Eve event. The winner will receive ¥10,000,000 and the second place will net ¥5,000,000.

Rizin Bantamweight Grand Prix 2021 bracket

Rizin 27 – Nagoya

Rizin  27 – Nagoya was initially scheduled to be a combat sport event held by Rizin Fighting Federation on March 14, 2021, at the Tokyo Dome in Tokyo, Japan. However, in February it was announced that the event was postponed to take place at Nippon Gaishi Hall in Nagoya, Japan, on March 21, 2021.

Background
A Rizin Women's Super Atomweight Championship rematch bout between current two-time champion Ayaka Hamasaki and Kanna Asakura is expected to headline this event. The pairing met previously at Rizin 14 on December 31, 2018, where Hamasaki won via armbar in the second round to capture the inaugural Rizin  Women's Super Atomweight title.

The co-main event featured a lightweight bout between the brazilian grappler Roberto de Souza and the former lightweight King of Pancrase Kazuki Tokudome.

Riki Sakurai missed weight limit ahead of his fight against Riku Yoshida, Sakurai was 1.95 kilograms over the limit. The fight will proceed, Sakurai started the fight with minus 2 points and the bout was declared no contest because he win.

Tsuyoshi Sudario was fined after he landed punches after the referee stops the fight, he has been fined 25 percent of his purse.

Results

Rizin 28 – Tokyo

Rizin 28 – Tokyo was a Combat sport event held by Rizin Fighting Federation on June 13, 2021, at the Tokyo Dome in Tokyo, Japan.

Background
The event featured the one time RIZIN Featherweight title challenger Mikuru Asakura who made his tenth RIZIN appearance against the former KSW Featherweight Champion Kleber Koike Erbst as the event headliner.

Roberto de Souza and Tofiq Musayev battled for the inaugural Rizin Fighting Federation Lightweight Championship.

This event also hosted the first half of Rizin Bantamweight Grand Prix Opening round fights. The event was originally scheduled to take place on May 23, however due to a State of Emergency being declared between April 25 to May 9, the event was postponed to June 13. Due to the ticketing system, the event numbers will stay as they are. This will be the first MMA event in the Tokyo Dome in 18 years and they are hoping to hold at least 50% capacity for the venue, equaling about 25,000 spectators.

RIZIN Featherweight champion Yutaka Saito fought Vugar Keramov in a non-title bout.

A heavyweight bout between Tsuyoshi Sudario and Shoma Shibisai was announced for the event.

RISE Welterweight champion BeyNoah made his mixed martial arts debut against Satoshi Yamasu in a 73 kg catchweight bout.

Results

Rizin 29 – Osaka

Rizin 29 – Osaka was a Combat sport event held by Rizin Fighting Federation on June 27, 2021, at the Maruzen Intec Arena in Osaka, Japan. The event was originally scheduled for May 23, but was subsequently postponed due to a state of emergency declared in response to the COVID-19 pandemic.

Background
This event is expected to host the second half of Rizin Bantamweight Grand Prix initial round fights. The event will be held with 50% capacity, equaling about 5000 spectators.

A four-man 60 kg kickboxing tournament was announced for this event, featuring Ryo Takahashi, Koji, Genji Umeno and Taiju Shiratori.

Two additional kickboxing bouts were scheduled for the event: Seiki Ueyama was set to fight Jyosei Izumi at flyweight, while Yuma Yamahata was scheduled to fight Kiyoto Takahashi in a catchweight bout.

It was announced that the Shooto Lightweight champion Yuki Kawana would fight Yusuke Yachi, while Rikuto Shirakawa would fight Jin Aoi at featherweight.

Two more bouts were announced on May 28: a flyweight bout between the former Pancrase champion Daichi Kitakata and the former DEEP flyweight champion Yusaku Nakamura, as well as a flyweight kickboxing bout between the former Lumpinee and Rajadamnern champion Nadaka Yoshinari and Chikai.

Results

Rizin 30 - Saitama

Rizin 30 - Saitama was a Combat sport event held by Rizin Fighting Federation on September 19, 2021, at the Saitama Super Arena in Saitama, Japan.

Background
The event would also feature the quarterfinal bouts of the bantamweight Grand Prix.

Ayaka Hamasaki was scheduled to face Emi Fujino in a non-title bout in the co-main event.

Olympic Greco-Roman wrestling silver medalist Shinobu Ota and former K-1 Welterweight champion Yuta Kubo were scheduled to fight in a featherweight bout.

KNOCK OUT 65 kg champion Chihiro Suzuki was scheduled to face the 18-year mixed martial arts veteran Shoji Maruyama in a featherweight bout.

Koji Takeda and Yusuke Yachi were scheduled to face each other in a featherweight bout.

Two UFC veterans, Yoshinori Horie and Ulka Sasaki were scheduled to face each other in a featherweight bout.

A women's atomweight kickboxing bout between Panchan Rina and Momoka Mandokoro was scheduled for the event. It was the first women's kickboxing bout in Rizin history.

Results

Rizin Landmark Vol.1

Rizin Landmark vol.1 was a Combat sport event held by Rizin Fighting Federation on October 2, 2021, in Tokyo, Japan.

Background
The event was headlined by a 68 kg catchweight bout between Mikuru Asakura and Kyohei Hagiwara.

On August 21, 2021, Rizin announced two bantamweight bouts were announced for the event: Masakazu Imanari would face Takeshi Kasugai, while Shooto Watanabe would face Kuya Ito. Ito later withdrew from his bout with Watanabe due to COVID-19 protocols, and was replaced by Nobutaka Naito.

Results

Rizin 31 - Yokohama

Rizin 31 - Yokohama was a Combat sport event held by Rizin Fighting Federation on October 24, 2021, at the Pia Arena in Yokohama, Japan.

Background
A featherweight title fight between the reigning champion Yutaka Saito and title challenger Juntaro Ushiku was scheduled as the event headliner.

A women's super atomweight bout between the reigning Jewels atomweight and DEEP Microweight champion Saori Oshima and the two-time Rizin FF atomweight title challenger Kanna Asakura was announced for the event.

Rizin-regular Tsuyoshi Sudario was scheduled to face Radlein Saint Ilme in a heavyweight bout.

Results

Rizin 32 - Okinawa

Rizin 32 - Okinawa was a Combat sport event held by Rizin Fighting Federation on November 20, 2021, at the Okinawa Arena in Okinawa, Japan.

Background
The event was headlined by a super-atomweight bout between the 2017 Super Atomweight Grand Prix runner-up Rena Kubota and the one-time Rizin Super Atomweight title challenger Miyuu Yamamoto.

Results

Rizin Trigger 1

Rizin Trigger 1 was a Combat sport event held by Rizin Fighting Federation on November 28, 2021, at the World Memorial Hall in Kobe, Japan.

Background
The event was the first time Rizin's hold the bouts  in a cage instead of a ring.

Results

Rizin 33 - Saitama

Rizin 33 - Saitama was a Combat sport event held by Rizin Fighting Federation on December 31, 2021, at the Saitama Super Arena in Saitama, Japan.

Background
A Rizin Lightweight Championship title bout between reigning champion Roberto de Souza and title challenger Yusuke Yachi was scheduled as the event headliner.

Rizin Bantamweight Grand Prix Semi-final bouts were scheduled to take place during the event.

Results

See also
List of current Rizin FF fighters
 2021 in UFC 
 Bellator MMA in 2021
 2021 in ONE Championship 
 2021 in Konfrontacja Sztuk Walki
 2021 in Absolute Championship Akhmat
 2021 in Road FC

References

External links
 Official event
 

Rizin Fighting Federation
2021 in mixed martial arts
2021 in Japanese sport
2021 sport-related lists